Martin Ruben Zamora is an American politician and farmer, currently serving as a member of the New Mexico House of Representatives. A Republican, Zamora represents the 63rd district, which includes Santa Rosa, New Mexico.

Biography 
Zamora was born and raised in Clovis, New Mexico.

Prior to his election to the New Mexico House of Representatives, Zamora owned and operated several agriculture businesses. He currently owns a farm in Clovis and a ranch in Torrance County. Zamora took office on January 15, 2019, succeeding incumbent Democrat George Dodge. Zamora was re-elected with 59% of the vote.

After Joe Biden defeated Donald Trump in the 2020 presidential election, Zamora cast doubt on the integrity of the election results. Zamora has declined to state whether he believes Biden won the election.

References 

Republican Party members of the New Mexico House of Representatives
American farmers
People from Clovis, New Mexico
Year of birth missing (living people)
Living people
Hispanic and Latino American state legislators in New Mexico